Badamzar (also Romanized as Bādāmzār; also known as Bāmazar and Bāmzār) is a village in Pian Rural District, in the Central District of Izeh County, Khuzestan Province, Iran. At the 2006 census, its population was 140, in 19 families.

References 

Populated places in Izeh County